The men's 400 metres event at the 2015 European Athletics Indoor Championships was held on 6 March at 11:00 (heats), 17:10 (semifinals) and on 7 March at 19:10 (final) local time.

Medalists

Results

Heats
Qualification: First 2 of each heat (Q) and the next 6 fastest (q) qualified for the semifinals.

Semifinals
Qualification: First 2 of each semifinal (Q) qualified directly for the final.

Final

References

2015 European Athletics Indoor Championships
400 metres at the European Athletics Indoor Championships